Bobby Plummer was a former American football head coach for Sharpstown High School. He played college football at Texas Christian University. He was selected by the Dallas Cowboys in the third round (39th overall) of the 1962 NFL Draft.

Early years
Plummer attended Seymour High School. He accepted a football scholarship from Texas Christian University. He was a two-way tackle and became a starter as a sophomore, playing on the same line as Bob Lilly.

In 1961, he accidentally hit All-American halfback Jimmy Saxton in the head with his knee, which contributed to a poor game by Saxton and TCU defeating the previous unbeaten University of Texas 6-0. He received second-team All-SWC honors after the season.

Professional career

Dallas Cowboys
Plummer was selected by the Dallas Cowboys in the third round (39th overall) of the 1962 NFL Draft and by the Dallas Texans in the fifth round (35th overall) of the 1962 AFL Draft.

On December 6, 1961, he signed with the Cowboys. During training camp he was tried at offensive tackle and guard. He was released on September 4, 1962.

Coaching career
Plummer was the head football coach at Sharpstown High School for 28 years, where he had a 112–164–4 record. Sharpstown made the Houston High School playoffs in 1984 under Coach Plummer, which, at the time were held in the Astrodome. They lost to Spring Branch in the first round.

References

Living people
TCU Horned Frogs football players
High school football coaches in Texas
People from Baylor County, Texas
Players of American football from Texas
Year of birth missing (living people)